The Quxue Dam is a rock-fill embankment dam on the Shuoqu River in Dêrong County of Sichuan Province, China. The primary purpose of the dam is hydroelectric power generation : it supports a 246 MW power station. Construction on the dam began in 2013 and the river was diverted around the construction site in February 2014. The power station was completed in 2016.

See also

List of tallest dams in the world
List of dams and reservoirs in China
List of tallest dams in China

References

Dams in China
Rock-filled dams
Garzê Tibetan Autonomous Prefecture
Hydroelectric power stations in Sichuan
Energy infrastructure completed in 2016